The Mayor of Charlestown was the head of the municipal government in Charlestown, Massachusetts. There was no Mayor of Charlestown until 1847 because up to that point Charlestown was still incorporated as a town. When Charlestown was annexed by the City of Boston, the position was abolished.

List of mayors

See also
Guide to the City of Charlestown records.
List of mayors of Boston, Massachusetts (1874-Present), Most current mayors.

Charlestown